Choose Love is the 14th studio album by Ringo Starr, released in 2005.

Background and recording
Recorded throughout 2004 into 2005, using the same team that created Vertical Man (1998) and Ringo Rama (2003), Starr produced the set with longtime musical partner Mark Hudson and performed it with their studio team. The title track has a Beatles-like "Day Tripper" guitar riff with a coda similar to "The Word" and mentions the Beatles songs "The Long and Winding Road", "Tomorrow Never Knows" and "What Goes On". As ever, a Starr album would be lacking if it did not include some celebrity guests and Choose Love does not deviate from the formula; it features Billy Preston and Chrissie Hynde as its most notable guests.

Release
Choose Love was released on 7 June 2005 in the US, and on 25 July in the UK. There was an edition of the album that was a dual disc (CD on side, DVD on the other), with the DVD component featuring bonus features on the making of the album.

Reception

Choose Love failed to chart in both the UK and US, where both Vertical Man and Ringo Rama had seen of commercial success. The album received strong reviews upon its release and preceded another promotional tour with Starr and his studio band, called "The Roundheads".

Track listing

Personnel
Personnel per booklet.

Musicians
Ringo Starr – drums, percussion, vocals, intro/outro demo tape on "Oh My Lord", organ, loop on "Free Drinks"
Mark Hudson – bass, acoustic guitar, electric guitar, backing vocals, keyboards, sax arrangement, harmonica
Gary Burr – acoustic guitar, electric guitar, backing vocals, bass, slide guitar
Mark Mirando – electric guitar, backing vocals
Dan Higgins – horns, saxes, woodwinds
Gary Grant – horns
Jim Cox – horn arrangement, piano, sax arrangement, woodwind arrangement
Robert Randolph – lead guitar
Steve Dudas – electric guitar, acoustic guitar
Billy Preston – piano, B3 organ, backing vocals on "Hard to Be True"
The Rose Stone Choir – backing vocals on "Oh My Lord"
Rose Stone – choir arrangement on "Oh My Lord"
Ringo Starr, Mark Hudson, Gary Burr – uboo drum band on "Hard to Be True"
John Amato – saxes
Chrissie Hynde  – lead vocals on "Don't Hang Up"
Barbara Bach – devil voice on "The Turnaround"
Dean Grakal – background vocals on "The Turnaround"

Production
Ringo Starr, Mark Hudson – producers
Bruce Sugar – recording
Kevin Churko, Gary Burr, Steve Dudas – additional recording
Dave Way – mixing
Lior Goldenberg, Ghian Wright, Andy Brohard – assistant engineers
George Marino – mastering
Tyrone Drake – art direction, design
Barbara Starkey – cover photo
Ringo Starr, Barbara Starkey, Mark Hudson, Gary Burr, Edward AJAJ, Teness Herman – additional photos

References
 Footnotes

 Citations

External links

2005 albums
Ringo Starr albums
Albums produced by Mark Hudson (musician)
Albums produced by Ringo Starr